Rörstrand porcelain was one of the most famous Swedish porcelain manufacturers, with production initially at Karlbergskanalen in Birkastan in Stockholm.

History

The Rörstrand waterfront site was first documented in the 13th century, when Magnus Ladulås donated property to the Convent of Poor Clares. In 1527, under Gustavus Vasa, the area was returned to the crown. The area was named "Rörstrand" because the clear lake's shore was overgrown with reeds.

After an ”Associations contract between all concerned in the Swedish Porcelain works, which will be established at great Rörstrand in the Delft manner” was signed in 1726, a porcelain factory was built at the castle of Rörstrand. The factory had indeed been given the privilege to produce true porcelain, but faience was the only ware that was actually produced until the 1770s. In 1758, the rival manufactory at Marieberg began to produce porcellanous stoneware. High production costs, a small market, and strong competition from imported Chinese porcelain kept Rörstrand from trying to copy Marieberg's goods.

By the 1770s, Rörstrand began producing its own version of English stoneware, but it took a substantial amount of time until Rörstrand succeeded in mastering the technology. After the acquisition of Marieberg in 1785, Rörstrand was the only major Swedish porcelain factory, and technology was not a priority. Only after Gustavsberg, founded in 1826, become a competitor, mass production of transfer-printed tableware (earthenware) took off. During the 1860s, the Rörstrand porcelain facility was one of the nation's largest factories.

In 1900, Rörstrand employed around 1,100 people. The factory's products had an excellent reputation worldwide and participated successfully in various art and industrial exhibitions.

The expansion of Stockholm city meant that the land was needed for housing. The factory in Rörstrand was closed down and demolished in 1926. Production was moved first to Gothenburg (after acquiring the Gothenburg porcelain factory) and then to Lidköping in the 1930s.

Between 1960 and 1990, Rörstrand passed through several owners, including Upsala-Ekeby AB, Finnish Wärtsilä, Hakusan and Gustavsberg porcelain factory. As of 2001, Rörstrand is a part of Iittala, which moved production to Sri Lanka and Hungary. On 30 December 2005, the factory in Lidköping closed down. Thus ended an important chapter of Swedish industrial history after almost 280 years. In 2007, Iittala, which owns the Rörstrand brand, was acquired in turn by Fiskars.

The former porcelain factory is now a museum, in which the legacy lives on.

Tableware
Right from the beginning, it was possible to order complete dinnerware table sets in the same decor. They were usually custom-made, and no product names were assigned to these sets.

When printed decors for mass production turned up - the first dinnerware dates from 1826 - they were not given product names. In the mid-1800s, a few descriptive names such as "Turkish pattern" appeared in the price lists, but only at the end of the 1800s product names for tableware were introduced. The exception is the Willow pattern, which was already well known and well reputed in England; Rörstrand produced its version of the decor between 1830 and 1888.

The "Purple Lace" pattern was one of the 1800s most popular tableware sets and manufactured well into the 1900s, with production from 1845 to 1934. At the turn of the century, Rörstrand created a range of tableware sets which were produced for nearly 50 years, for example "Bella" and "Vineta".

Another of Rörstrand's long-running dinnerware sets was "Green Anna" (Swedish: Gröna Anna or Grön Anna). Starting in 1926, the design was produced by the Gothenburg Porcelain Factory. "Ostindia" is an example of one of the factory's popular designs; it is still produced today.

As for more recent productions, "Mon Amie" - the white porcelain tableware with cobalt blue nuanced flowers - was designed by Marianne Westman in 1952. Through the years, "Mon Amie" became a classic and was relaunched in 2008 as a celebration of Marianne Westman's 80th birthday.

In 1956, Rörstrand designer Hertha Bengtson developed "Koka Blå". In the 1960s, the "Koka" design was also launched in the versions brown and green.

Some important products

Since the 1760s, leading manufacturers of stoves
1760s: first printed decors
1770s: first pieces of earthenware
1881: first dinner service of feldspar porcelain
1930: presentation of the National tableware, designed by Louise Adelborg, the Stockholm Exhibition of 1930
1991: presentation of the Nobel tableware, used since the Nobel Banquet

Some Rörstrand designers and potters

Gallery

See also
Porcelain manufacturing companies in Europe

References

Citations

Sources
Ankarberg, Carl-Henrik; Nystrom, Bengt: Rörstrand in Stockholm: brick, ceramic fajansmanufaktur and major industry 1270-1926, Stockholmia, Stockholm 2007, Monographs issued by the City, 0282-5899; 184 (Swedish). ISBN 978-91-7031 - 184-0 (inb.). Libris 10,468,157
Bæckström, Arvid: Employment and disciplinary conditions in Rörstrands porcelain factory during the 1700s, the Museum of Technology, Stockholm 1934 (Swedish). Libris 10,353,271.
Bæckström, Arvid: A so-called Cadogan-pitcher from Rörstrands childhood, Gothenburg 1951 (Swedish). Libris 10,553,574
Bæckström, Arvid: Some ceramic messages: one more Cadogan-pitcher, Gothenburg 1953 (Swedish). Libris 10,553,585
Candr'eus, Cecilia: "... new materials and manageable products ...": of Gustavsberg Fabriker manufacture of household plastics 1945-1970, Department of Art History University of Uppsala, Uppsala, 1998 (Swedish). Libris 10,145,021
Eriksson, Gunilla: Flint Porcelain with printed decoration, Kulturen, Lund 1969 (Swedish). Libris 10,556,682
Folcker, Eric G.: The oldest Rörstrandsfajanserna, 1910-1925 (Swedish). Libris 10,556,740 .
Herlitz Gezelius, Ann Marie: Rörstrand, Signum, Lund 1989, Books on Art (Signum), 99-0345976-9 (Swedish).  (inb.). Libris 7748022
Jarefjäll, Katali; Quirin Bertil: Rörstrand: people, objects, plant, Bertil Quirin, [center] 2006 (Swedish).  (inb.). Libris 10,283,218
Johansson, G.: Rörstrand: from manufacture to modern large-scale industry, 1726–1944, Malmo 1944 (Swedish). Libris 9820376
Lagercrantz, Bo: Iris, Vineta and Green Anna Rörstrands Tableware 1860-1960, ICA, Västerås 1962 (Swedish). Libris 8873368
The new Rörstrand. [Sweden] 1951 (Swedish). Libris 11,356,427
Lagercrantz Stay: Rörstrand: decors 1850-1990, Rörstrands museum, [Lidköping 1990 (Swedish). Libris 1235293
Nystrom, Bengt; Brunius Jan: Rörstrand 280 years: the faience, earthenware, porcelain & stoneware, Ica, Västerås 2007 (Swedish).  (inb.). Libris 10,140,658
Rörstrand Museum (Lidköping); Eklund Petter: Rörstrand Museum: everyday products and porslinsprimadonnor, Rörstrand Museum, Lidköping 2008 (Swedish). Libris 10,740,953
Vogel Rödin Gosta: Rörstrand 250 years: the exhibition 17 June to 31 August 1976, Västergötland tourist association, Skövde 1976 (Swedish). Libris 1,320,085
Gyllensvärd Bo, Hernmarck Carl: Rörstrand during three centuries: 1726-1943: Exhibition April 3 to May 16, 1943, *Nationalmuseum, Stockholm 1943, the National Museum exhibition catalog, 0585-3222, 91 (Swedish). Libris 1,411,525
Rörstrands porcelain factory., Strengnas printed to Carl Erik Ekmarck. 1831 (Swedish). Libris 10,197,300
Rörstrand Decors., Hackman Rörstrand, Lidköping 1996 (Swedish). Libris 2233424 .
Scherman, Susanna, 1964 -; Perlmutter, Michael: The Swedish stove: 1700s production from Marieberg and Rörstrand, *Wahlström & Widstrand, Stockholm 2007 (Swedish).  (inb.). Libris 10,415,873
Ray, Gustaf Holdo: Rörstrand and Marieberg: a contribution to the Swedish ceramics history of UTI 18th century., The author., Stockholm 1870 (Swedish). Libris 1585292
Ray, Gustaf Holdo: Rörstrands history and the effects of 1726-1850., Stockholm 1879, Rörstrands collection of earthenware and porcelain, a (Swedish). Libris 1610727
Terrine from then and now: Rörstrand United States 260 years, 1986 (Swedish). Libris 3264927

External links
Rörstrands Porcelain
Rörstrand Museum in Lidköping
Porcelain factory in Lidköping
Article about Rörstrand
Rörstrand - Technical Museum 

Porcelain
Ceramics manufacturers of Sweden
Defunct manufacturing companies of Sweden
Purveyors to the Court of Sweden
Wärtsilä
Fiskars